Pliomelaena sauteri is a species of tephritid or fruit flies in the genus Pliomelaena of the family Tephritidae.

Distribution
The species is found in Taiwan and Indonesia.

References

Tephritinae
Insects described in 1911
Diptera of Asia